United Nations Security Council Resolution 138 was adopted on June 23, 1960, after a complaint that the transfer of Adolf Eichmann to Israel from Argentina constituted a violation of the latter's sovereignty. The Council declared that such acts, if repeated, could endanger international peace and security and requested that Israel make the appropriate reparation in accordance with the Charter of the United Nations and the rules of international law. Israel held the view that the matter was beyond the Council's competence and should instead be settled via direct bilateral negotiations. Israel and Argentina did conduct further negotiations, and on August 3 issued a joint declaration admitting that Argentine sovereignty had been violated, but that the dispute had been resolved.

Resolution 138 was approved by eight votes to none; the People's Republic of Poland and the Soviet Union abstained. Argentina was present but did not participate in voting.

See also
List of United Nations Security Council Resolutions 101 to 200 (1953–1965)

References

External links
 
Text of the Resolution at undocs.org

 0138
1960 in Argentina
 0138
 0138
1960 in Israel
Argentina–Israel relations
June 1960 events